Anna Vostrikova (born 24 August 2002) is a Russian short track speed skater. She competed at the 2022 Winter Olympics, in Women's 1000 metres.

She competed at the 2021–22 ISU Speed Skating World Cup.

References 

2002 births
Living people
Russian female short track speed skaters
Short track speed skaters at the 2022 Winter Olympics
Olympic short track speed skaters of Russia
21st-century Russian women